This article covers the 2009 AFL season results for AFL team, the Brisbane Lions.

Squad for 2009 
Statistics are correct as of start of 2009 season.

Player Changes

In

Out

Ladder

Results

NAB Cup

Home and Away Season

Finals series

Week 1

Week 2

Statistics

Leading Goalkickers

Milestones

Awards

References

External links 
Official Website of the Brisbane Lions Football Club
Official Website of the Australian Football League 

Brisbane Lions
2009
Brisbane Lions